Shakespeare's Globe is a reconstruction of the Globe Theatre, an Elizabethan playhouse for which William Shakespeare wrote his plays, in the London Borough of Southwark, on the south bank of the River Thames. The original theatre was built in 1599, destroyed by a fire in 1613, rebuilt in 1614, and then demolished in 1644. The modern Globe Theatre is an academic approximation based on available evidence of the 1599 and 1614 buildings. It is considered quite realistic, though modern safety requirements mean that it accommodates only 1,400 spectators compared to the original theatre's 3,000.

It opened to the public in 1997, with a production of Henry V. The site also includes the Sam Wanamaker Playhouse, an indoor theatre which opened in January 2014. This is a smaller, candle-lit space based on historic plans for an indoor playhouse of Jacobean era London (possibly Blackfriars Theatre). The Sackler Studios, an educational and rehearsal studio complex, is situated just around the corner from the main site.

Michelle Terry currently serves as artistic director. She is the second actor-manager in charge of the organisation, following Mark Rylance, the founding artistic director.

Planning and construction
In 1970, American actor and director Sam Wanamaker founded the Shakespeare Globe Trust and the International Shakespeare Globe Centre, with the objective of building a faithful recreation of Shakespeare's Globe close to its original location at Bankside, Southwark. This inspired the founding of a number of Shakespeare's Globe Centres around the world, an activity in which Wanamaker also participated.

Many people maintained that a faithful Globe reconstruction was impossible to achieve due to the complications in the 16th-century design and modern fire safety requirements; however, Wanamaker and his associate Diana Devlin persevered in their vision for over 20 years to create the theatre. A new Globe theatre was eventually built according to a design based on the research of historical adviser John Orrell.

It was Wanamaker's wish that the new building recreate the Globe as it existed during most of Shakespeare's time there; that is, the 1599 building rather than its 1614 replacement. A study was made of what was known of the construction of The Theatre, the building from which the 1599 Globe obtained much of its timber, as a starting point for the modern building's design. To this were added: examinations of other surviving London buildings from the latter part of the 16th century; comparisons with other theatres of the period (particularly the Fortune Playhouse, for which the building contract survives); and contemporary drawings and descriptions of the first Globe. For practical reasons, some features of the 1614 rebuilding were incorporated into the modern design, such as the external staircases. The design team consisted of architect Theo Crosby of Pentagram, structural and services engineer Buro Happold, and quantity surveyors from Boyden & Co. The construction, building research and historic design details were undertaken by McCurdy & Co.

In 1994, the name "Globe Theatre" was used by one of the theatres in Shaftesbury Avenue; to make the name available and to avoid confusion, that year it was renamed as the Gielgud Theatre.

The theatre opened in 1997 under the name "Shakespeare's Globe Theatre", and has staged plays every summer. Mark Rylance became the first artistic director in 1995 and was succeeded by Dominic Dromgoole in 2006. In January 2016, Emma Rice began her term as the Globe's third artistic director, but in October 2016 announced her decision to resign from the position. On 24 July 2017 her successor was announced to be the actor and writer Michelle Terry.

Listed Georgian townhouses now occupy part of the original site and could not be considered for removal. Like the original Globe, the modern theatre has a thrust stage that projects into a large circular yard surrounded by three tiers of raked seating. The only covered parts of the amphitheatre are the stage and the seating areas. Plays are staged during the summer, usually between May and the first week of October; in the winter, the theatre is used for educational purposes. Tours are available all year round. Some productions are filmed and released to cinemas as Globe on Screen productions (usually in the year following the live production), and on DVD.

The reconstruction was carefully researched so that the new building would be as faithful a replica of the original as possible. This was aided by the discovery of the remains of the original Rose Theatre, a nearby neighbour to the Globe, as final plans were being made for the site and structure.

The building itself is constructed entirely of English oak, with mortise and tenon joints and is, in this sense, an "authentic" 16th-century timber-framed building as no structural steel was used. The seats are simple benches (though cushions can be hired for performances) and the Globe has what has been claimed to be the first and only thatched roof permitted in London since the Great Fire of London in 1666. The modern thatch is well protected by fire retardants, and sprinklers on the roof ensure further protection against fire. The pit has a concrete surface, as opposed to earthen-ground covered with strewn rush from the original theatre. The theatre has extensive backstage support areas for actors and musicians, and is attached to a modern lobby, restaurant, gift shop and visitor centre. Seating capacity is 873 with an additional 700 "Groundlings" standing in the yard, making up an audience about half the size of a typical audience in Shakespeare's time.

For its first 18 seasons, performances were engineered to duplicate the original environment of Shakespeare's Globe; there were no spotlights, and plays were staged during daylight hours and in the evenings (with the help of interior floodlights), there were no microphones, speakers or amplification. All music was performed live, most often on period instruments; and the actors and the audience could see and interact easily with each other, adding to the feeling of a shared experience and of a community event.

Typically, performances have been created in the spirit of experimentation to explore the original playing conditions of the 1599 Globe. Modern and conventional theatre technology such as spotlights and microphones were not used during this period. Beginning in the 2016 season, the new artistic director, Emma Rice, began experimenting with the theatre space by installing a temporary lighting and sound rig. The current artistic director, Michelle Terry, has brought back the experimentation on original playing conditions.

The Globe operates without any public subsidy and generates £24 million in revenue per year.

Sam Wanamaker Playhouse

Adjacent to the Globe is the Sam Wanamaker Playhouse, an indoor theatre modelled after a Jacobean-era theatre and used for performances during the winter months when the main theatre cannot be used.

Read Not Dead
Read Not Dead  is a series of play readings, or staged "performances with scripts" that have been presented as part of the educational programme of Shakespeare's Globe since 1995. The plays selected are those that were written between 1576 and 1642 by Shakespeare's contemporaries or near contemporaries. These readings are performed at Shakespeare's Globe Sackler Studios as well as other theatres, halls, festivals and fields nationwide.

In 2013 there were Read Not Dead performances at the Wilderness Festival and at the Glastonbury Festival. In 2014, the final production in Read not Dead's first season was performed at the Sam Wanamaker Playhouse, which is the indoor Jacobean style theatre. The play selected for that occasion was Robert Daborne’s A Christian Turn'd Turk.

Globe on Screen
The Globe's productions are often screened in cinemas and released on DVD. In 2015, the venue launched Globe Player, a video-on-demand service enabling viewers to watch the plays on laptops and mobile devices. The theatre was the first in the world to make its plays available as video-on-demand.

Other replicas
Replicas and free interpretations of the Globe have been built around the world:

 Argentina
 Argentina: Teatro Shakespeare.

 Germany

 Neuss am Rhein: Globe Neuss
 Rust, Baden, Germany: in the Europa-Park
 Schwäbisch Hall, Baden-Württemberg: houses a replica of the interior of the Globe Theatre.
 Italy
 Rome: Globe Theatre

 Japan
 Tokyo: Panasonic Globe Theatre
 Tokyo: Meisei University's Shakespeare Hall, at its Hino campus
 New Zealand
 Auckland: Pop-up Globe
 United States
 Ashland, Oregon: Allen Elizabethan Theatre
 Austin, Texas: Curtain Theatre
 Cedar City, Utah: Adams Shakespearean Theatre
 Dallas, Texas: Old Globe Theatre
 Odessa, Texas: Globe of the Great Southwest
 San Diego, California: Old Globe Theatre
 Williamsburg, Virginia: Globe Theatre, in Busch Gardens Williamsburg
 Twin Lake, Michigan: Blue Lake Fine Arts Camp, The Rose Playhouse.

See also (period theatres)

Curtain Theatre
The Rose

Notes

Further reading
 Carson, Christie and Karim Cooper Shakespeare's Globe: A theatrical Experiment Cambridge University Press, 2008, 
 Day, Barry: This Wooden 'O': Shakespeare's Globe Reborn. Oberon Books, London, 1997. .
 Fiorillo, Ezio, Shakespeare’s Globe. As You Like It, aut Enim Interpretari Placet, Translation by Jackie Little, All’insegna del Matamoros, Algua (Bergamo) 2013. 
 
 Rylance, Mark: Play: A Recollection in Pictures and Words of the First Five Years of Play at Shakespeares's Globe Theatre. Photogr.: Sheila Burnett, Donald Cooper, Richard Kolina, John Tramper. Shakespeare's Globe Publ., London, 2003. .

External links

 Shakespeare's Globe
 Shakespeare's Globe at Google Cultural Institute
 Plays performed at the reconstructed Globe (by season) (Shakespeare's Globe)
 April 2012 BBC Radio 4 The Reunion programme about the building of Shakespeare's Globe
 Globe Theatre Study Guide
 Building a Piece of History The Story of the New Globe Theatre By Zachary T. Oser
 Satellite photo of the rebuilt Globe Theatre
 Rose Theatre Website
 Entertainment at The Globe in Shakespeare's time
 3D Model of Globe Theatre done by Wesleyan University's Learning Objects Studio
 Shakespeare's Globe at the Shakespeare Resource Center
 Doctor Who Episode guide for 'The Shakespeare Code'
 Shakespeare's Globe 2008 'Totus Mundus' season
 Tokyo Globe Theatre (Japanese only)
 Teatro Shakespeare Buenos Aires (Mobile construction that evokes an Elizabethan Theatre)

Buildings and structures completed in 1997
Theatres in the London Borough of Southwark
Rotundas in the United Kingdom
Theatres completed in 1997
Outdoor theatres
Rebuilt buildings and structures in the United Kingdom
Producing house theatres in London
Buildings and structures on the River Thames
Museums in the London Borough of Southwark
Theatre museums
Literary museums in London
Museums on the River Thames
Thatched buildings in England
1997 establishments in England
Replica buildings
Timber framed buildings in London
Renaissance reenactment
Memorials to William Shakespeare